Rafael Ángel Madrigal Aguirre (4 November 1902 – 1985) was a Costa Rican footballer who represented the Costa Rica national football team between 1921 and 1930. He was nicknamed "Macho", and played for Costa Rican club La Libertad.

Career statistics

International

International goals
Scores and results list Costa Rica's goal tally first, score column indicates score after each Costa Rica goal.

References

1902 births
1985 deaths
Footballers from San José, Costa Rica
Costa Rican footballers
Costa Rica international footballers
Association football forwards